Bulcsú may refer to:

 Bulcsú (chieftain), 10th-century Magyar leader
 Bulcsú Lád, 13th-century Hungarian bishop and nobleman
 Bulcsú Hoppál (born 1974), Hungarian theologian and philosopher
 Bulcsú Székely (born 1976), Hungarian water polo player